Changed is the eighth studio album by American country music group Rascal Flatts. It is their second studio album release after signing with Big Machine Records, and was released on April 3, 2012. The band released the album's debut single, "Banjo", on January 16, 2012. The album's second single "Come Wake Me Up" released to country radio on May 21, 2012. The album's third single, "Changed", released to country radio on December 17, 2012, AC and Christian AC on January 22, 2013. On June 28, 2013, Rascal Flatts released "Sunrise" as their first official single in the UK. This is the first album from the group to not have a Top 40 hit on the pop chart. This is the group's first album not to go platinum and last to go gold.

Content
Gary LeVox explains the title, "Actually there's a song on the album called "Changed" and it's a really, really special song. And we thought that title of that song really captures what this new season of our career is because everything in our professional career has changed...(we) thought the title was appropriate." Rascal Flatts worked with long-time producer Dann Huff on their new album but also produced a few of the tracks on their own.

The Limited Deluxe Edition 'ZinePak includes the 15-song Changed Deluxe CD, an exclusive 72-page magazine, and a set of four Rascal Flatts guitar picks. The magazine includes exclusive interviews with Gary, Jay and Joe Don, rare photographs, lyrics, commentary on the band's career and much more. Only 40,000 copies are available. The Limited Deluxe Edition version was exclusively available at Wal-Mart stores.

In the weeks leading up to the album's release, three promotional singles were released for music download; the title track was released on March 13, 2012, "Hot In Here" on March 20, 2012, and "She's Leaving" on March 27, 2012.

Commercial performance
In the United States, the album debuted at No. 3 on the Billboard 200 with first-week sales of 130,000 copies. It also was the trio's seventh consecutive album to debut at No. 1 on the Billboard Country Albums chart, making them only the fourth act in Nielsen Soundscan history to attain this goal.  As of April 3, 2013, the album has sold 502,000 copies in the US.

In Australia, Changed made its debut on the ARIA albums at No. 51 and peaked at No. 2, the band's highest position on the ARIA country chart to date. On January 11, 2013, Changed debuted on the Swedish Albums Chart at No. 14. It is the band's first appearance and highest position on the Swedish Albums Chart to date. In the United Kingdom, "Changed" debuted on the Official UK Albums Top 100 chart at No. 87 and No. 1 on the Country Artist Albums Top 20 chart.

As of April 2014, the album has sold 560,000 copies in the United States.

Critical reception

Billy Dukes of Taste of Country gave the album four stars out of five, saying that it was true that Changed is the most country project they've released in 10 years, and there are some new approaches on tracks like "Sunrise" and "Let It Hurt", on which he notes, "The second verse of this dark, brooding ballad is brilliant, and LeVox goes somewhere deep to bring it to life." Matt Bjorke of Roughstock gave it four stars out of five, saying, "Changed represents the continuation of a new chapter for the trio in their career and while the songs on the album don't represent the "change" some critics and some fans may have hoped for, what they have done is provide their loyal set of fans and other country fans a strong, consistent album of radio-ready material and something that can compete with the bands chompin' at their feet to take their place as the #1 band in country music."" Jessica Nicholson of Country Weekly gave the release three-and-a-half stars out of five, saying that "the album lacks some of the energy and freshness of 2010's Nothing Like This, but introspective tunes such as "A Little Home," "Sunrise" and "Come Wake Me Up" add even more depth to the trio's sound." AllMusic's Stephen Thomas Erlewine gave the album three out of five stars, saying the album "errs on the side of caution" and "toned down the brightness" from their prior release, but praised the consistency of the songs and the "cool assured adult contemporary pulse of "Hot in Here."" Michael McCall of the Associated Press gave the album a positive review, saying that they sound wiser and more grounded, balancing grown-up, light country-rockers with ballads grounded in real life and the album proves they have moved forward in the most important of ways — with their music. Grace Duffy of the Under The Gun Review gave the album seven out of ten stars, saying that the album is an open and natural addition to Rascal Flatts’ repertoire. Meena Iyer of Musicperk gave the album eight-and-a-half out of ten stars, saying "the album is a mixture of soulful music which can melt your heart and few fun upbeat tracks to make you dance." Brian Mansfield of USA Today gave the album three out of five stars, saying "the trio has streamlined its mix of pop and country in Changed." Jon Caramanica of The New York Times gave the album a positive review, saying "on this album has largely taken to heart." Robert Silva of About.com gave the album three out of five stars, saying "the new record puts the trio in more rootsy territory than their previous effort, Nothing Like This." Sarah Gibson of ukCOUNTRYmusic.NET gave the album nine out of ten stars, saying "this album reflects the style we know and love from the group and not a "changed" style as the title suggests, and the album is reflective of their true country roots."

Tours 
Rascal Flatts started their Changed Tour on October 26, 2012 and their Live and Loud Tour on May 31, 2013.

Set list 
The following set list is representative of the show in Camden that Took Place at Susquehanna Bank Center. It does not represent all concerts for the duration of the tour.

Tour dates

Box office score data

Track listing

Chart performance

Weekly charts

Year-end charts

Singles

Certifications

Personnel 
The following musicians are credited on the booklet.

Rascal Flatts
 Jay DeMarcus – bass guitar, backing vocals, electric guitar (10, 13), bouzouki (13), mandolin (13)
 Gary LeVox – lead vocals
 Joe Don Rooney – electric guitar, backing vocals, acoustic guitar (14)

Additional Musicians
 Charlie Judge – Hammond B3 organ (1, 2, 3, 9), synthesizers (1, 3, 4, 6, 9), keyboards (2, 5, 7, 8, 10-15), synth strings (4, 6), programming (8, 10, 12, 13, 15)
 Robbie Buchanan – Wurlitzer electric piano (2), acoustic piano (3, 4, 6, 7, 8)
 Gordon Mote – acoustic piano (6, 11, 14)
 David Huff – programming (10, 13)
 Sean Neff – programming (10)
 Tom Bukovac – electric guitar, acoustic guitar (11, 14, 15)
 Dann Huff – electric guitar (1, 2, 4-9, 11, 14), acoustic guitar (1, 4, 7, 9, 11, 14), 12-string acoustic guitar (2), bouzouki (2, 4, 14), mandolin (2, 4, 7, 9, 14), B-Bender guitar (3), ganjo (4), banjo (9), sitar (9), programming (13)
 Ilya Toshinsky – acoustic guitar (1, 2, 5, 6, 8, 10-15), banjo (2, 5), fiddle (2), dobro (5), bouzouki (6), mandolin (7, 10, 11, 12), octomandolin (7)
 Paul Franklin – steel guitar (3, 4, 6, 8, 11, 14)
 Travis Toy – banjo (7), steel guitar (10, 12, 13), dobro (15)
 Dorian Crozier – drums (1-4, 7, 8)
 Chris McHugh – drums (5, 6, 9, 11, 14)
 Shannon Forrest – drums (10, 12, 13, 15), cowbell (10)
 Eric Darken – percussion (1-9, 11, 14)
 Jonathan Yudkin – fiddle (2, 5), accordion (3), mandolin (3), viola (3, 5, 11), cello (5, 11), violin (5, 11)
 Jenee Fleener – fiddle (10, 12, 15), viola (13), violin (13)
 Jill Johnson – lead vocals (4)

Production 
 Dann Huff – producer (1-9, 11, 14)
 Rascal Flatts – producers 
 Darrell Franklin – A&R 
 Allison Jones – A&R
 Kelly King – A&R
 Drew Bollman – recording (1-9, 11, 14), recording assistant (1-9, 11, 14), mix assistant (1-9, 11, 14)
 Mark Hagen – recording (1-9, 11, 14), digital editing (1-9, 11, 14)
 Sean Neff – recording, digital editing, mixing (10, 12, 13, 15)
 Justin Niebank – recording (1-9, 11, 14), mixing (1-9, 11, 14)
 Amir Aly – vocal recording for Jill Johnson (4)
 Taylor Nyquist – recording assistant 
 Seth Morton – mix assistant (1-9, 11, 14)
 Nathan Yarborough – mix assistant (1-9, 11, 14)
 Adam Ayan – mastering 
 Big Machine Creative – art direction
 Becky Reiser – design 
 Randee St. Nicholas – photography
 Spalding Entertainment – management

Studios 
 Recorded at Blackbird Studio and The Grip Recording Studio (Nashville, Tennessee); Pop Planet Studios (Johannesburg, South Africa).
 Mixed at Blackbird Studio and The Grip Recording Studio.
 Mastered at Gateway Mastering (Portland, Maine).

Release history

References

2012 albums
Albums produced by Dann Huff
Big Machine Records albums
Rascal Flatts albums